is a private university in Matsumoto, Nagano Prefecture, Japan, established in 2002.

Matsusho Gakuen Junior College
 is a private junior college in Matsumoto, Nagano, Japan. The junior college opened in April 1953, but the predecessor of the school was founded in 1898. It has been affiliated with Matsumoto University since 2002. It offers courses in Commerce
and Management information.

References

External links
 Official website

Educational institutions established in 2002
Private universities and colleges in Japan
Universities and colleges in Nagano Prefecture
2002 establishments in Japan
Matsumoto, Nagano